is a Japanese sprinter who specialized in the 200 metres. He finished fourth in the 4 × 100 metres relay at the 2001 World Championships, together with teammates Ryo Matsuda, Shingo Suetsugu and Nobuharu Asahara.

Personal bests

International competition

References

External links

1979 births
Living people
Japanese male sprinters
Sportspeople from Hyōgo Prefecture
World Athletics Championships athletes for Japan